Fung Ying-ki (born 7 February  1980) is a Paralympic wheelchair fencer from Hong Kong, China. At the 2000 Summer Paralympics he won three gold medals in the men's individual foil, team foil, and individual sabre events and took bronze in team sabre. Four years later at the Athens Paralympics, he won two golds in individual foil and team sabre and a silver in team foil.

Fung lost the use of his legs as a child after contracting a virus which damaged his spinal cord (Actue Transverse Myelitis in 1994 with paraplegia). At age 15, he began practicing wheelchair fencing at a national training facility in Hong Kong (Hong Kong Sports Institute). After the 2004 Paralympic Games he relearn to walk with lower limbs sensation deficiency and retired from fencing.

In the months leading up to the 2008 Summer Paralympics in Beijing, Fung coached Japanese wheelchair fencer Toyoaki Hisakawa in preparation for the games.

In recent years, he started participating in wheelchair marathon. He completed his first full marathon in Osaka, Japan in 2011. Then in 2012, he completed the Standard Chartered Hong Kong Marathon and was the first local wheelchair racer to complete the entire course. In 2013, he won the wheelchair half-marathon for the same event. He hopes that the increasing profile of wheelchair events locally can provide more opportunities and choices to the athletes with disabilities in Hong Kong.

Education
Fung Ying-ki studied at Kiangsu-Chekiang College (Shatin) during his early years and he received a B.A. with honors in Physical Education and Recreation Management from Hong Kong Baptist University (香港浸會大學) and a MEd in Sports Biomechanics from National Taiwan Normal University (國立臺灣師範大學). He is also a graduate of the first cohort of Master in Physiotherapy degree (MPT) in Hong Kong Polytechnic University in 2013. He is a current PhD candidate at Department of Orthopaedics and Traumatology, Faculty of Medicine, The Chinese University of Hong Kong (香港中文大學).

In 2010 summer Fung Ying Ki received a Postgraduate Travel Award from International Society on Biomechanics in Sports, and he is commission member of Hong Kong Association of Sports Medicine and Sports Science from 2010 to 2012. Meanwhile, he is one of the classification committee member of International Paralympic Committee (IPC) from 2010 to 2014.

Research Interest
Classification system in Paralympics Sports
Cluster analysis
Computational modeling
Sports Equipment Technology (SET)
Muscle mechanics
Motion analysis in sports

Published conference abstracts
 Fung YK, Chan MS, Lee YS, Shiang TY (2017).The comparison of EMG characteristics and metabolic cost between walking and running near preferred transition speed. Journal of Biomechanical Science and Engineering, 12(2), xxx-xxx
 Chung MML, Chan WYR,  Fung YK, Fong SMS, Lam SLS, Lai WKC, Ng SMS (2014). Reliability and validity of alternate step test times in subjects with chronic stroke. Journal of Rehabilitation Medicine, 46, 969-974
 Chan DKC, Fung YK, Xing S, Hagger MS (2014). Myopia prevention, near work, and visual acuity of college students: integrating the theory of planned behavior and self-determination theory. Journal of Behavioral Medicine, 37(1), 369-380
 Fung YK, Chan DKC, Caudwell KM, Chow BC (2013). Is the wheelchair fencing classification fair enough? A kinematic analysis among world-class wheelchair fencers. European Journal of Adapted Physical Activity, 6(1), 17-29
 Chung, WM, Fung YK (2012). Sports medicine for the physically disabled. The Hong Kong Medical Diary, 16(12), 20-22
 Chan DKC, Fung YK, Hagger MS (2012). Motivation for myopia prevention: a preliminary test of the trans-contextual model. Psychology and Health, 27, 18-19
 Yung PSH, Fung YK, Chung MML, Wong CWY, Fong DTP, Chan KM (2010). Clinical practice of thumb kinematics analysis for Carpal Tunnel Syndrome - a pilot study. In Proceedings of the 30th Annual Congress of The Hong Kong Orthopaedic Association (pp. 96), Hong Kong, China. [Nov 27–28, 2010].
 Yung PSH, Chan YW, Fung YK, Chung MML, Fong DTP, Chan KM (2010). An inexpensive functional finger prosthesis with rebounded type progressive hinge lock. In Proceedings of the 30th Annual Congress of The Hong Kong Orthopaedic Association (pp. 95), Hong Kong, China. [Nov 27–28, 2010].
 Yung PSH, Chung MML, Fung YK, Fong DTP, Chan KM (2010). A portable pressure meter for scoliosis brace fitting. In Proceedings of the 30th Annual Congress of The Hong Kong Orthopaedic Association (pp. 93), Hong Kong, China. [Nov 27–28, 2010].
 Fong DTP, Chan YYW, Fung YK, Wong CWY, Hung LK, Liao WH (2010). An inexpensive functional finger prosthesis. In Proceedings of SMART - Sports Medicine And Rehabilitation Therapy 2010 Convention (pp. 10–11), Hong Kong, China. [Oct 9, 2010].
 Fung YK, Chow BC, Fong DTP, Chan KM (2010). A kinematic analysis of trunk ability in wheelchair fencing: a pilot study. In Proceedings of XXVIII International Conference on Biomechanics in Sports (pp. 126–129), Marquette, USA. [Jul 19–23, 2010].
 Fung YK, Chan KM (2010). Functional ability between different categories of wheelchair fencer. In Proceedings of the 3rd HKASMSS Student Conference on Sport Medicine, Rehabilitation and Exercise Science (pp. 21–22), Hong Kong, China. [Jun 19, 2010].
 Fung YK, Shiang TY, Huang CF (2008). Kinetic analysis to poweriser (An energy storage and return spring device). In Proceedings of XXVI International Conference on Biomechanics in Sports, (pp. 366–369), Seoul, Korea. [Jul 14–18, 2008].

References 

1980 births
Living people
Hong Kong male foil fencers
Paralympic wheelchair fencers of Hong Kong
Wheelchair fencers at the 2000 Summer Paralympics
Wheelchair fencers at the 2004 Summer Paralympics
Paralympic gold medalists for Hong Kong
Paralympic silver medalists for Hong Kong
Paralympic bronze medalists for Hong Kong
Medalists at the 2000 Summer Paralympics
Medalists at the 2004 Summer Paralympics
Paralympic medalists in wheelchair fencing
Alumni of Hong Kong Baptist University
National Taiwan Normal University alumni
Alumni of the Chinese University of Hong Kong
Alumni of the Hong Kong Polytechnic University
Hong Kong male sabre fencers